Peng Xinyong (born 20 January 1973) is a Chinese former badminton player. She competed at the 1996 Summer Olympics in the women's and mixed doubles teamed-up with Chen Ying and Chen Xingdong respectively. Together with Chen Xingdong, she reached a career high as World No. 3 in the mixed doubles event. Peng won a gold medal at the 1997 East Asian Games in the women's doubles event with Zhang Jin. She also part of the national team that won the 1995 Sudirman Cup and runner-up at the 1996 Uber Cup.

Achievements

World Cup 
Mixed doubles

Asian Championships 
Women's doubles

East Asian Games 
Women's doubles

Mixed doubles

IBF World Grand Prix 
The World Badminton Grand Prix sanctioned by International Badminton Federation (IBF) since 1983.

Women's doubles

Mixed doubles

IBF International 
Women's doubles

References

External links
 

1973 births
Living people
Badminton players from Shandong
Chinese female badminton players
Badminton players at the 1996 Summer Olympics
Olympic badminton players of China